Alexa Kriele (born 1961) is a German author and is considered a medium. She describes herself as an "angel interpreter", because, according to her own statements, she can interpret between people and angels.

Career
Alexa Kriele was born in 1961, in Überlingen. She comes from a family of doctors. Kriele studied philosophy and psychology. She worked as a journalist at first. Since 1994, her work has focused on "interpreting angels". She is married to Martin Kriele, a German constitutional law teacher. She lives and works with her family near Berlin. Kriele writes books, produces DVDs and CDs. She has also appeared on television.

Selected works

Videos

 
 
 
 
  Interview

Books
 Wie im Himmel so auf Erden. 4 Bände. Falk, Seeon 1998–2001; Ullstein, Berlin 2007, 
 Die Engel geben Antwort auf Fragen nach dem Sinn des Lebens. Hugendubel, Kreuzlingen 2002; Goldmann, München 2012, 
 Mit den Engeln das Leben meistern. Hugendubel, München 2003
 Mit den Engeln über die Schwelle zum Jenseits. Hugendubel, München 2004; Ullstein, Berlin 2009, 
 Von Naturgeistern lernen. Hugendubel, München 2005; Ullstein, Berlin 2008, 
 Beten mit den Engeln. Hugendubel, München 2006; Ullstein, Berlin 2008, 
 Engel weisen Wege zur Heilung. Knaur, München 2007; neu als: Sprich mit deinem Körper, ebd. 2010, 
 Wie Wünsche wirklich wahr werden. Franziskus, Stockheim 2010, 
 Es werde Licht. Goldmann, München 2014,

References

External links 
 Official website 
 Books, CDs, and DVDs by Alexa Kriele
 

1961 births
Living people
German women writers
Spiritual mediums
German psychics